Chinemelu D. Elonu Jr. (born March 11, 1987) is a Nigerian-American professional basketball player for Capitanes de Arecibo of the Baloncesto Superior Nacional (BSN). He played college basketball for Texas A&M.

High school career
Elonu attended Alief Elsik High School where he averaged 15.0 points per game as a senior, helping the team to a 33–5 record while posting career highs of 21 points and 20 rebounds. He was ranked as the No. 48 power forward in the country by Scout.com.

College career
Elonu played at Texas A&M University, where he played with the Aggies, from 2006 to 2009. In his junior and final season, he averaged 10 points and 7 rebounds per game. He graduated from the school in May 2009 with a Bachelor of Science degree in Agricultural Leadership and Development.

Professional career
Elonu was drafted by the Los Angeles Lakers with the 59th pick in the 2009 NBA draft. He later signed a two-year deal with the Spanish team CAI Zaragoza where he averaged 6.3 points and 5.8 rebounds per game. He had an opt-out clause that would have allowed him to sign with the Lakers after the 2009–10 season. After one year, he left Zaragoza.

In August 2010, Elonu signed a contract with Panionios in Greece. He left Panionios before the end of the season after being replaced by Ryvon Covile. On January 25, 2011, Elonu signed a contract with Pau-Orthez in France in order to replace the injured Travon Bryant. He averaged 10.0 points and 8.3 rebounds per game.

In July 2012, Elonu joined the Los Angeles Lakers for the 2012 NBA Summer League. On August 16, 2012, Elonu signed a contract with Tofaş of the Turkish Basketball Super League. In June 2013, Elonu signed with Jiangsu Dragons from China. For the 2013–14 season, Elonu re-signed with Tofaş. During his second stint with the Turkish club, Elonu averaged 12.1 points, 8.5 rebounds and 1.1 blocks in the Turkish League and 16.2 points, 9.7 rebounds and 1.8 blocks in the EuroChallenge.

In May 2014, Elonu came back to CAI Zaragoza after four years, and signed a contract until the end of the 2013–14 ACB season. On July 17, 2014, he returned to Tofaş. During the season, he participated at the Turkish League Slam Dunk contest, among with Kenny Gabriel, Jan Vesely, Furkan Korkmaz, JaJuan Johnson, Patric Young, Sinan Güler and Sean Williams.

On June 9, 2015, Elonu signed with Capitanes de Arecibo of Puerto Rico. On November 9, 2015, Elonu signed with Turkish club Beşiktaş for the 2015–16 season. With them he averaged 8.0 points, 6.1 rebounds and 1.1 blocks in the Turkish League and 9.4 points, 6.0 rebounds, 1.6 steals and 1.6 blocks in EuroCup.

On January 2, 2017, Elonu signed with AEK Athens in Greece for the rest of the 2016–17 season, replacing Randal Falker on the team's squad. On June 5, 2017, he re-joined the Capitanes de Arecibo for the rest of the 2017 BSN season.

On August 18, 2017, Elonu re-joined AEK Athens for the 2017–18 season. Where they won the Basketball Champions League (BCL).

On September 28, 2018, Elonu signed a deal with Italian club Pallacanestro Reggiana.

On April 18, 2021, Elonu signed with Egyptian side Zamalek to play in the 2021 BAL season. He won the first-ever BAL championship with the team. In July 2021, he came back to Capitanes de Arecibo.

Statistics

Regular season

|-
|-
| style="text-align:left;"| 2010–11
| style="text-align:left;"| Panionios
| align=center | GBL
| 9 || 21.2 || .471 || –|| .571 || 6.6 || 0.2 || 0.7 || 1.7 || 7.6
|-
| style="text-align:left;"| 2011–12
| style="text-align:left;"| Pau-Orthez
| align=center | LNB Pro A
| 30 || 24.2 || .634 || –|| .603 || 8.3 || 0.6 || 0.6 || 1.1 || 10.4
|-
| style="text-align:left;"| 2012–13
| style="text-align:left;"| Tofaş
| align=center | BSL
| 29 || 21.2 || .661 || –|| .515 || 7.6 || 0.3 || 0.4 || 1.1 || 9.6
|-
| style="text-align:left;"| 2016–17
| style="text-align:left;"| AEK Athens
| align=center | GBL
| 14 || 14.1 || .623 || –|| .743 || 5.7 || 0.5 || 0.5 || 0.4 || 6.6
|-
| style="text-align:left;"| 2017–18
| style="text-align:left;"| AEK Athens
| align=center | GBL
| 12 || 13.2 || .523 || –|| .556 || 4.3 || 0.6 || 0.1 || 0.9 || 5.1
|}
Playoffs

|-
|-
| style="text-align:left;"| 2013
| style="text-align:left;"| Tofaş
| align=center | BSL
| 2 || 23.0 || .474 || .500 || .833 || 8.5 || 1.0 || 0.0 || 0.5 || 11.5
|-
| style="text-align:left;"| 2016–17
| style="text-align:left;"| AEK Athens
| align=center | GBL
| 9 || 15.0 || .632 || –|| .722 || 5.6 || 0.4 || 0.1 || 0.8 || 6.8
|-
|}

FIBA Champions League

|-
| style="text-align:left;" | 2016–17
| style="text-align:left;" | A.E.K.
| 8 || 14.0 || .545 || – || .481 || 4.5 || .3 || .3 || 1.3 || 6.1
|-
| style="text-align:left;background:#AFE6BA;" | 2017–18†
| style="text-align:left;" | A.E.K.
| 11 || 12.4 || .632 || – || .700 || 3.3 || .4 || .2 || .5 || 5.6
|}

BAL

|-
|style="text-align:left;background:#afe6ba;"|2021†
|style="text-align:left;"|Zamalek
| 6 || 0 || 18.2 || .594 || .000 || .571 || 7.7 || .8|| .7 ||.8 || 8.3
|- class="sortbottom"
| style="text-align:center;" colspan="2"|Career
| 6 || 0 || 18.2 || .594 || .000 || .571 || 7.7 || .8|| .7 ||.8 || 8.3

Personal life
The son of Dozie and Amaka Elonu, he majored in agricultural leadership. He has also one sister, Adaora Elonu currently playing for Uni Girona CB.

Elonu has lived in Puerto Rico since 2015.

References

External links
EuroCup Profile
FIBA Game Center Profile
Eurobasket.com Profile
Spanish League Profile 
TBLStat.net Profile
Greek League Profile 
Greek League Profile 
Texas A&M Aggies bio

1987 births
Living people
AEK B.C. players
American expatriate basketball people in Egypt
American expatriate basketball people in Greece
American expatriate basketball people in Italy
American expatriate basketball people in Spain
American men's basketball players
Basketball players from Texas
Basket Zaragoza players
Beşiktaş men's basketball players
Capitanes de Arecibo players
Centers (basketball)
Élan Béarnais players
Jiangsu Dragons players
Lega Basket Serie A players
Liga ACB players
Los Angeles Lakers draft picks
Nigerian expatriate basketball people in Italy
Nigerian expatriate basketball people in Spain
Nigerian expatriate basketball people in the United States
Nigerian expatriate sportspeople in Greece
Nigerian men's basketball players
Pallacanestro Reggiana players
Panionios B.C. players
Power forwards (basketball)
Texas A&M Aggies men's basketball players
Tofaş S.K. players
Zamalek SC basketball players